The Lyon tramway comprises eight lines, seven lines operated by TCL and one by Rhônexpress in the city of Lyon in Auvergne-Rhône-Alpes, France. The original tramway network in Lyon was developed in 1879, and the modern network was built in 2001.

Lines T1 and T2 opened in January 2001; T3 opened in December 2006; line T4 opened in April 2009; line Rhônexpress (airport connector) opened in August 2010; line T5 opened in November 2012; line T6 opened in November 2019 and line T7 opened in February 2021. The tramway system complements the Lyon Metro and forms an integral part of the public transportation system (TCL) in Lyon. The network is currently served by 73 Alstom Citadis 302 and 34 Alstom Citadis 402 trams.

Line T1 extends from Debourg to La Doua–IUT Feyssine via Perrache, Gare Part-Dieu–Vivier Merle and Charpennes. Line T2 runs from Hôtel de Région–Montrochet to Saint-Priest - Bel-Air via Perrache, Jean Macé, Grange Blanche and Porte des Alpes. Line T3 goes from Gare Part-Dieu–Villette to Meyzieu–ZI (on weekends) and Meyzieu–Les Panettes (on weekdays) via Vaulx-en-Velin–La Soie. Line T4 runs from La Doua–Gaston Berger to Hôpital Feyzin Vénissieux via Charpennes, Gare Part-Dieu–Villette, Jet d'Eau–Mendès France and Gare de Vénissieux. Line T5 runs from Grange Blanche to Eurexpo. Line T6 runs from Debourg to Hôpitaux Est–Pinel via Beauvisage–CISL, Mermoz–Pinel and Desgenettes. Line T7 links Vaulx-en-Velin–La Soie to Décines–OL Vallée.

History: the original network (1879 - 1957) 

The first steam-driven tram line, the number 12, linked Lyon and Vénissieux in 1888. The network was electrified between 1893 and 1899. Extensions to the suburbs were built until 1914. This was the height of the network - high quality service, low price, high frequency and high profitability for shareholders. The inflation between World War I and World War II made the network unprofitable. Beginning in the 1930s, tramways were progressively replaced with trolleybuses and later buses. A modernization plan, including underground sections in the city centre, planned in the 1940s was rapidly abandoned. The last urban tram ran on line 4 in January 1956 and the last suburban tram, the "Train bleu" in Neuville-sur-Saône, was abandoned in June 1957.

Original OTL network
The first tram network was built and operated by the Compagnie des Omnibus et tramways de Lyon (OTL), founded in 1879. It consisted of ten  (standard gauge), horse-drawn lines with a total length of 44 km serving Lyon, Villeurbanne, La Mulatière et Oullins .

In 1894, new electric trams were in service with these lines:
 1 : Bellecour – Monplaisir via le Pont et la Grande Rue de la Guillotière
 2 : Bellecour – Montchat
 3 : Cordeliers – Villeurbanne
 4 : Parc de la Tête d'or – La Mouche (now Jean Macé), extended to Perrache
 5 : Bellecour – Pont d'Écully via Pont du Change
 6 : Terreaux – Gare de Vaise via Quai Saint-Vincent
 7 : Perrache – Les Brotteaux via Pont Morand
 8 : Pont Morand – Saint-Clair
 9 : Bellecour – Saint-Paul via Pont Tilsitt (now Pont Bonaparte)
 10 : Bellecour – Oullins.

The first line to open was line 5, from Place Bellecour to Vaise along the Saône river, competing with riverboats. Lines 1 and 7 followed the approximate routes of the current metro lines D and A, respectively. The network was gradually extended, by the OTL and by acquisitions of competing operators, between 1894 and 1914.

OTL extensions

 11 : Bellecour - Bon-Coin (Villeurbanne)
 12 : Bellecour - Saint-Fons, extended to Vénissieux
 13 : Cours Bayard (south of Perrache) - Place Commandant Arnaud (at the Croix-Rousse)
 14 : Pont d'Oullins - Chaponost
 15 : Charité - Pierre-Bénite
 16 : Bellecour - Meyzieu - La Balme (Isère)
 17 : Tolozan - Montluel (Ain)
 18 : Gare Saint-Paul - La Mouche, extended to Gerland
 28 : Cordeliers - Brotteaux
 31 : Pont-Mouton - Saint-Rambert-l'Île-Barbe
 32 : Charité - Vitriolerie.

La Société du Tramway d'Écully
 (Metre gauge) lines to the northwest, acquired by the OTL in 1894.
 19 : Pont-Mouton - Écully
 20 : Pont-Mouton - Saint-Cyr-au-Mont-d'Or
 21 : Pont-Mouton - Champagne-au-Mont-d'Or, extended to Limonest.
 22 : Pont-Mouton - Saint-Didier-au-Mont-d'Or.

La Compagnie Lyonnaise des Tramways (CLT)
Metre gauge, steam powered lines on the left bank of the Rhône river. Became the Nouvelle Compagnie Lyonnaise des Tramways (NLT) in 1902, then acquired by the OTL in 1906.
 23 : Pont Lafayette - Cimetière de la Guillotière, extended to Monplaisir-la-Plaine. The extension of the line, electrified to Saint-Priest used the number 34 from 1925 à 1935.
 24 : Pont Lafayette - Asile de Bron, extended to Bron (Village).
 25 : Cordeliers - Montchat, extended to Genas.
 26 : Rue Casimier-Périer - Parc de la Tête d'Or
 27 : Cordeliers - Vaulx-en-Velin.

La Compagnie du Fourvière Ouest Lyonnais (FOL)
Fourvière and Saint-Just funiculars and trams in the west plateau. Acquired by the OTL in 1910.
 29 : Saint-Just - Sainte-Foy-lès-Lyon
 30 : Saint-Just - Francheville.

La Compagnie du Tramway de Caluire (CTC)
Acquired by the OTL in 1914. Originally metric gauge, converted to standard gauge in 1925.
 33 : Croix-Rousse - Caluire, extended to Les Marronniers (Fontaines-sur-Saône).

Tramway de l'Ouest du Dauphiné
This company reach Lyon in 1909.The meter gauge line leading to the east suburb was used on 6 km after being electrified in 1925.
 34 Cordeliers - Saint-Priest

The current network (since 2001)
Following a decline in the 1950s and 1960s, public transit in Lyon was revived in the 1970s with the opening of the Lyon Metro. In 1996 a decision was made to build a new tram network to complement the metro. The first two lines were opened on 2 January 2001: Line T1 from Perrache to IUT–Feyssine via Part-Dieu and Charpennes and line T2 from Perrache to Porte des Alpes via Jean Macé and Grange Blanche. Line T2 was extended to Saint-Priest–Bel Air on 27 October 2003 and line T1 was extended to Montrochet on 15 September 2005, then again to Debourg on 19 February 2014. Line T3 (codenamed LEA) was opened on 4 December 2006 along the former Chemin de Fer de l'Est Lyonnais tracks from Gare Part-Dieu–Villette to Meyzieu–ZI. Line T4 opened on 20 April 2009, running from Jet d'Eau–Mendès France to Hôpital Feyzin Vénissieux, and was extended to La Doua on 29 August 2013. Line T5 opened on 17 November 2012, running from Grange Blanche to Eurexpo.

Line T1

Operates from 04:40 to 00:35, maintained by the Centre de Maintenance de Saint-Priest - Porte des Alpes.

Debourg    
ENS Lyon 
Halle Tony Garnier
Musée des Confluences
Hôtel de Région–Montrochet  
Sainte-Blandine  
Place des Archives   
Perrache     
Quai Claude Bernard
Rue de l'Université
Saint-André
Guillotière–Gabriel Péri  
Liberté
Saxe–Préfecture
Palais de Justice–Mairie du 3ème (connection at Place Guichard–Bourse du Travail with walking distance)
Part-Dieu–Auditorium
Gare Part-Dieu–Vivier Merle    (connections at Gare Part-Dieu–Villette with walking distance)
Thiers–Lafayette  
Collège Bellecombe  
Charpennes–Charles Hernu     
Le Tonkin  
Condorcet  
Université Lyon 1  
La Doua–Gaston Berger  
INSA–Einstein
Croix-Luizet
La Doua–IUT Feyssine

Line T2

Operates from 04:55 to 00:34, maintained by the Centre de Maintenance de Saint-Priest - Porte des Alpes.

Hôtel de Région–Montrochet  
Sainte-Blandine  
Place des Archives   
Perrache     
Centre Berthelot–Sciences Po Lyon
Jean Macé   
Garibaldi–Berthelot
Route de Vienne
Jet d'Eau–Mendès France  
Villon (nearby at Lycée Lumière)
Bachut–Mairie du 8ème
Jean XXIII–Maryse Bastié
Grange Blanche    
Ambroise Paré  
Desgenettes   
Essarts–Iris  
Boutasse–Camille Rousset  
Hôtel de Ville–Bron  
Les Alizés  
Rebufer
Parilly Université–Hippodrome 
Europe–Université
Porte des Alpes
Parc Technologique
Hauts de Feuilly
Salvador Allende
Alfred de Vigny
Saint-Priest–Hôtel de Ville
Esplanade des Arts
Jules Ferry
Cordière
Saint-Priest–Bel Air

Line T2 has been extended from Perrache to Hôtel de Région–Montrochet on 24 March 2021, sharing the track of line T1.

Line T3

Operates from 04:32 to 00:06, maintained by the Centre de Maintenance de Meyzieu.

Codenamed "LEA" (Ligne de l'Est de l'Agglomération), Line T3 runs along a portion of the former CFEL (Compagnie des chemins de fer de l'Est de Lyon) train line which extended from the Gare de l'Est de Lyon to Saint-Genix-d'Aoste (via Crémieu, Jallieu et Montalieu).

 Gare Part-Dieu–Villette     (connections at Gare Part-Dieu–Vivier Merle with walking distance)
Dauphiné–Lacassagne
Reconnaissance–Balzac
Gare de Villeurbanne
Bel Air–Les Brosses
Vaulx-en-Velin–La Soie     
Décines–Centre  
Décines–Grand Large  
Meyzieu–Gare
Meyzieu–ZI   (service ends here on weekends)
Meyzieu–Les Panettes (only from Monday to Friday)

Line T3, which is 14.6 km long, runs largely on ballasted railroad track. It takes 23 minutes to go from Gare Part-Dieu - Villette to Meyzieu - ZI, and runs at a maximum speed of 70 km/h (60 km/h at intersections, of which 26 are equipped with crossing gates). 7 km run near residential areas and are equipped with a noise barrier.

Line T4

Operates from 04:39 to 00:45, maintained by the Centre de Maintenance de Saint-Priest - Porte des Alpes.

La Doua–IUT Feyssine (7.30am to 9am only, as of November 2013)
Croix-Luizet (7.30am to 9am only, as of November 2013)
INSA–Einstein (7.30am to 9am only, as of November 2013)
La Doua–Gaston Berger  
Université Lyon 1  
Condorcet  
Le Tonkin  
Charpennes–Charles Hernu     
Collège Bellecombe  
Thiers–Lafayette  
Gare Part-Dieu–Villette     (connections at Gare Part-Dieu–Vivier Merle with walking distance)
Archives Départementales
Manufacture–Montluc
Lycée Colbert
Jet d'Eau–Mendès France  
Lycée Lumière
États-Unis–Musée Tony Garnier
Beauvisage–CISL  
États-Unis–Viviani
Joliot Curie–Marcel Sembat
La Borelle
Gare de Vénissieux   
Croizat–Paul Bert
Marcel Houël–Hôtel de Ville
Lycée Jacques Brel
Herriot–Cagne
Vénissy
Division Leclerc
Maurice Thorez 
Lénine–Corsière
Darnaise
Hôpital Feyzin Vénissieux

Line T5

Operates from 05:00 to 00:00, maintained by the Centre de Maintenance de Saint-Priest - Porte des Alpes.

Grange Blanche    
Ambroise Paré  
Desgenettes   
Essarts–Iris  
Boutasse–Camille Rousset  
Hôtel de Ville–Bron  
Les Alizés  
De Tassigny–Curial
Lycée Jean-Paul Sartre
Parc du Chêne (service ends here in July and August)
Eurexpo (except in July and August)

From its opening to 4 October 2020, line T5 served the stop Eurexpo only on exhibition days and only from 08:00 to 22:00 (sometimes to 00:00). Since 5 October 2020, line T5 serves Eurexpo everyday, except in July and August.

A projected extension to Chassieu, which would have added two new stations, Eurexpo 2 and René Cassin, was not approved by the public enquiry and has been postponed (possibly indefinitely) due to lack of support from local councillors.
Planning documents do however still include a future study of an extension to line T5 via Chassieu to meet line T3 close to the Parc Olympique Lyonnais spur. This link is considered to be strategic by the owners of the Eurexpo conference centre, as it could enable direct travel from Eurexpo to Lyon Part-Dieu railway station and to the airport.

Line T6

Operates from 05:00 to 00:56, maintained by the Centre de Maintenance de Saint-Priest - Porte des Alpes.

Debourg    
Challemel-Lacour–Artillerie
Moulin à Vent
Petite Guille
Beauvisage–Pressensé
Beauvisage–CISL  
Grange Rouge–Santy
Mermoz–Californie
Mermoz–Moselle
Mermoz–Pinel   
Essarts–Laënnec
Desgenettes   
Vinatier
Hôpitaux Est–Pinel

Line T6 has been built as an extension of line T1 from its terminus at Debourg to Lyon's eastern hospital complex. A subsequent extension to La Doua, the university campus in Villeurbanne, is also envisaged.

Line T7

Operates from 06:00 to 23:55 (from 08:00 on Saturday and from 09:00 on Sunday), maintained by the Centre de Maintenance de Meyzieu.

Vaulx-en-Velin–La Soie      
Décines–Centre   
Décines–Grand Large  
Décines–OL Vallée

Since its opening, the Parc Olympique Lyonnais is connected to the Lyon tram network with a specially built railway track, but this track was only used by special tram shuttles running on game or event days in the stadium. Line T7 has been launched as a daily tram service to serve the Parc Olympique Lyonnais and its developing neighborhood named OL Vallée.

This line didn't require the construction of any new railway, it only uses an infrastructure that already existed before, including a part of line T3 and the railway track that links line T3 to the Parc Olympique Lyonnais.

Rhônexpress

Rhônexpress is an express line which links La Part-Dieu (main railway station and business district) to Lyon–Saint-Exupéry international airport and TGV railway station, with two intermediate stops and a total of four stations.

Gare Part-Dieu–Villette     (connections at Gare Part-Dieu–Vivier Merle with walking distance)
Vaulx-en-Velin–La Soie     
Meyzieu–ZI  
Aéroport Lyon–Saint-Exupéry  

The route is served by 6 tram-trains, constructed by Swiss builder Stadler Rail. Its route consists of the existing T3 tram line, which is built with passing tracks to allow express service, and an  new track extension from Meyzieu–ZI to the airport. Total length of track is  needing approximately 30 minutes to go from Part-Dieu to the airport. Service runs from morning until last flight arrival, with departures every 15 minutes at peak times.

Work began on 9 October 2008 and was completed 9 August 2010. The Conseil général of the Rhône department franchised the operation rights for 30 years to Rhônexpress, a consortium including Vinci SA (28.2%), Veolia Transport (28.2%), Vossloh Infrastructure Service (4.2%), Cegelec Centre Est (2,8%) and the Caisse des dépôts et consignations. Unlike the Lyon tramways, the Rhônexpress is not run by TCL. Stadler's Tangos are used as rolling stock.

Map

Rolling stock
The TCL fleet is composed of 106 articulated Alstom Citadis X02 vehicles. 73 Citadis 302s, numbered N°801 - 873, were built between 2000 and 2009, and serve on lines T1, T2, T5, T6 and T7. 34 Citadis 402s, numbered N°874 - 906, were built between 2012 and 2020, and serve on lines T3 and T4. In August 2021, it was announced that Alstom will supply 35 additional Citadis trams to Lyon. These will be identical to the fifteen 43-metre trams delivered in 2020 and 2021, which feature a redesigned nose for better visibility and driving comfort.

Six Stadler Tango vehicles are used for the Rhônexpress service.

Development projects
Four tram lines are being studied for getting started by 2026:
T6 extension to La Doua, via Gratte-Ciel district in Villeurbanne
T8 : Bellecour - Part-Dieu - La Doua
T9 : La Doua - Vaulx-en-Velin Hôtel de Ville - Carré de Soie
T10 : Gerland - ZAC Technosud - Saint-Fons - Vénissieux railway station

See also 
 Trams in France
 List of town tramway systems in France

References

Inline citations

Bibliography 

 Lyon du tram au tram / Jean Arrivetz. - La Régordane, 2001. - 
 Sur les rails du Lyonnais : volume 2 : les réseaux secondaires, tacots, ficelles et métro / José Banaudo. - Les éditions du Cabri, Gérad Tisserand et De Borée 2002. - 
 20 Minutes - Le tramway Léa fait ses premiers pas.

External links 

  
 Section of the SYTRAL site discussing lines T3 and T4 
 Lyon en Lignes 

Rail transport in Lyon
Tram transport in France
Metre gauge railways in France
Town tramway systems by city